Joanna Bartel (born 29 December 1951 in Świętochłowice) - Polish actress, cabaret artist, singer and announcer. From her education she is painter. Currently she occurs in cabaret program Tok Szok.

In Poland she is best known from main role in Polish TV series Święta wojna in TVP2, but also lead license American programs Śmiechu warte (America's Funniest Home Videos) in TVP1.

Filmography 

 1981: Białe tango (8th episode)
 1982: Alicja as Dozorczyni (caretaker). She sang a song too.
 1986: Komedianci z wczorajszej ulicy as Adela (and author of song)
 1987: Sławna jak Sarajewo as Cyla
 from 1999: Święta wojna as Andzia Dworniok
 2005: Skazany na bluesa as Krystyna Riedel
 2007: Ryś - Krysia Wafelówa's voice
 2010: Milion dolarów – manager in Klub Emeryta (club for pensioners)

External links 
 Official Joanna Bartel's page
 
 Joanna Bartel's profile at filmpolski.pl
 Joanna Bartel's profile at e-teatr.pl
 Joanna Bartel at filmweb.pl

Living people
1951 births
Polish television actresses
Polish cabaret performers
20th-century Polish actresses
21st-century Polish actresses